Mad Grandiose Bloodfiends is Ancient's third full-length release.
The album was recorded, mixed and mastered in Cue Recording Studios, Falls Church, Virginia
during September 1997.

This album hearkens a rather drastic change of musical focus for the group, into a more melodic/gothic-oriented approach with an influx of clean/female singing, slower tempos and majestic stringed instruments, though much of the group's original black metal roots are still present.  Song/lyrical topics also moved in a new direction, particularly with topics about vampires/vampirism.  This has led to a strong backlash from fans and critics.

Track listing 

Music as indicated.
All lyrics by Kaiaphas except 6 - 9 by Thorne and 14 by King Diamond.

"Malkavian Twilight" - 00:39 (Aphazel)
"A Mad Blood Scenario" - 04:23 (Aphazel, Kaiaphas)
"The Draining" - 05:26	(Aphazel)
"Um Sonho Psycodelico" - 04:01	(Aphazel)
"Sleeping Princess of the Arges" - 06:32 (Jesus Christ!)
"Her Northern Majesty" - 05:51	(Aphazel)
"Blackeyes" - 07:21 (Jesus Christ!)
"The Emerald Tablet" - 07:14 (Aphazel)
"Willothewisp" - 07:22	(Jesus Christ!)
"Neptune" - 02:37 (Aphazel)
"5" - 04:10 (Kaiaphas)
"Hecate, My Love and Lust" - 06:04 (Aphazel)
"Vampirize Natasha" - 02:34 (Aphazel, Jesus Christ!, & Kaiaphas)
"Black Funeral" (Mercyful Fate cover) - 02:50 (Hank Shermann)

Kaiaphas wrote lyrics for the song Sleeping Princess of the Arges in 1994 for his then-band Grand Belial's Key. GBK's version has a different music and can be found on the demo Triumph of the Hordes.

Credits 

Aphazel - Guitars / Bass / Keyboards
Lord Kaiaphas - Vocals / Drums / Percussion
Jesus Christ! - Guitars / Bass / Keyboards / Cello / Piano
Erichte - Female Vocals
Produced by Aphazel
Engineered by Doug Johnston

Ancient (band) albums
1997 albums